Michoacán–Guanajuato volcanic field is located in the Michoacán and Guanajuato states of central Mexico. It is a volcanic field that takes the form of a large cinder cone field, with numerous shield volcanoes and maars. Pico de Tancítaro (3860 m) is the highest peak.

The volcanic field is best known for the 18th-century eruption of Jorullo volcano, and 20th-century eruption of Parícutin volcano.

Morphology

It contains 1400 vents, mostly cinder cones. The shield volcanoes are mostly Pleistocene in age. The field includes Siete Luminarias, a group of seven maars in and around Valle de Santiago in Guanajuato. Other volcanoes in the field include Alberca de los Espinos in Michoacán and Cerro Culiacán in Guanajuato.

The cinder cones are randomly arranged and occur at low altitudes, usually, on alluvial plains or on the flanks of eroded shield volcanoes. There are an average of 2.5 cinder cones every 2.

Eruptions

El Jorullo — 1759−1774

El Jorullo volcano began on September 29, 1759. Earthquakes occurred prior to this first day of the eruption. Once the cinder cone started erupting, it continued for 15 years, eventually stopping in 1774. El Jorullo destroyed what had been a rich agricultural area. The eruptions from El Jorullo were primarily phreatic and phreatomagmatic. They covered the area with sticky mudflows, water flows, and ash falls. All but the youngest lava flows were covered by this ashfall.

Later eruptions from El Jorullo were magmatic with neither mud nor water flows. This 15-year eruption was the longest one El Jorullo has had and was the longest cinder cone eruption known. Lava flows can still be seen to the north and west of the cinder cone. The eruption had a VEI of 4.

El Jorullo has four smaller cinder cones which have grown from its flanks. The vents of El Jorullo are aligned in a northeast to southwest direction. Lava from these vents cover nine km2 around the volcano. Later eruptions produced lavas that had higher silica contents making them more viscous than the earlier basalts and basaltic andesite lavas.

El Parícutin — 1943−1952

The Parícutin volcano began as a fissure in a cornfield owned by a Purépecha farmer, Dionisio Pulido, on February 20, 1943. Pulido, his wife, and their son all witnessed the initial eruption of ash and stones first-hand as they ploughed the field. El Parícutin grew quickly, reaching five stories tall in just a week, and it could be seen from afar in a month. Much of the volcano's growth occurred during its first year, while it was still in the explosive pyroclastic phase. The nearby villages of Paricutín (after which the volcano was named) and San Juan Parangaricutiro were both buried in lava and ash;. The residents relocated to nearby lands.

For the next eight years El Parícutin would continue erupting, although this was dominated by relatively quiet eruptions of lava that would scorch the surrounding  of land. The cinder cone's activity would slowly decline during this period until the last six months of the eruption, during which violent and explosive activity was frequent.

Like most cinder cones, Parícutin is believed to be a monogenetic volcano, which means that once it has finished erupting, it will never erupt again. Any new eruptions in the Michoacan-Guanajuato volcanic field will erupt in a new location.

Three people died as a result of lightning strikes caused by the eruptions, but no deaths were attributed to the lava or asphyxiation.

Gallery

References 

 Parícutin at Volcano World
 Parícutin: The Volcano Born in a Mexican Cornfield, Edited by James F Luhr and Tom Simkin, Phoenix AZ: Geoscience Press, 1993. The definitive collection of reports and documentary illustrations of the eruption and its effects up to the date of publication.
 Peakbagger.com Parícutin: Credits. Retrieved April 16, 2008.
 Volcano World (El Jorullo). Parícutin: Credits. Retrieved April 17, 2008.
 "El Jorullo: Credits". Volcano World. Retrieved Apr. 16, 2008.
 
 "El Jorullo: Credits". Popular Science Monthly. Retrieved Apr. 17, 2008.
 "El Jorullo: Credits". Bartleby.com. Retrieved Apr. 17, 2008.

External links 

 Parícutin: The Birth of A Volcano - at the Smithsonian
 The eruption of Parícutin (1943-1952)
 Video documentary (eng/spa) Volcano Parícutin (4min)

 
Volcanism of Mexico
Volcanic fields
Volcanoes of Guanajuato
Volcanoes of Michoacán
Natural history of Guanajuato
Natural history of Michoacán